The Order of Merit of the Portuguese Royal House ( or Ordem do Mérito da Causa Monárquica) is a dynastic order of knighthood for extraordinary services rendered to the Portuguese Royal House and for outstanding Merit in the Monarchist Cause.

The Order also conferred the Medal of dedication to the Monarchist Cause, Youth Medal of dedication to the Monarchist Cause and Youth Medal of Fidelity, though these are now suppressed through a reform carried out by the Grand-Master.

The Royal Patron is the Head of the Portuguese Royal House. The Chancellor of the Order is Dr. José António da Cunha Coutinho, Baron of Nossa Senhora da Oliveira.

History 
The Order was founded by decree of 12 April 1993 by His Royal Highness, the Duke of Bragança, Dom Duarte Pio. as a way to reward extraordinary services rendered to the Portuguese Monarchical Cause and for exceptional merit in the Monarchical Cause between 1973 and 1993.

The Order confers the following traditional ranks of Knighthood of the Knights and Dames of the Portuguese Royal House of Braganza namely: 
 Grand Collar
 Grand Cross
 Commander
 Knight/Dame
 Medal of Honour

Recipients 

 1993: Duarte Pio, Duke of Braganza
 2016: King Yuhi VI of Rwanda
 2020: Marek Vareka 
 2016: King Kigeli V of Rwanda
 2016: Prince Osman Rifat Ibrahim Prince of Egypt and Prince in Turkey
 2016: Prince Davit Bagrationi of Georgia

Gallery

References

Orders, decorations, and medals of Portugal
Orders of merit